The Des Moines Coliseum was a building located in Des Moines, Iowa. Opened in 1908, it served as the main venue for large public events in Des Moines for four decades. Herbert Hoover launched his 1932 re-election campaign from the Coliseum, and several other U.S. Presidents spoke there, including Woodrow Wilson, Theodore Roosevelt, and William Howard Taft.  Drake University played basketball in the Coliseum for a number of years, and it was used for wrestling, boxing, ice skating, and circus events. It was destroyed by fire on August 13, 1949. A YMCA was later built on the site, but that was torn down in 2015.  In 2018 the site was acquired by the GSA to become the new courthouse for the U.S. District Court for the Southern District of Iowa.

External links
Picture of the Des Moines Coliseum
Date of fire
Painting of the front of the Des Moines Coliseum

Sports in Des Moines, Iowa
Sports venues in Iowa
Drake Bulldogs men's basketball
Defunct college basketball venues in the United States
Buildings and structures in Des Moines, Iowa
Defunct indoor arenas in the United States
Sports venues completed in 1908
1908 establishments in Iowa
Indoor arenas in Iowa
1949 disestablishments in Iowa
Sports venues demolished in 1949
Boxing venues in the United States
Demolished buildings and structures in Iowa